Gaura Barhaj is a town and a municipal board in Deoria district in the state of Uttar Pradesh, India. It is at the banks of the holy Saryu (Ghaghra) River. Along the river banks, Sona mandir, the work place of a saint Baba Raghav Das, is located and it is a prominent place of attraction in the town.

Demographics
 India census, Gaura Barhaj had a population of 1,38,489. Males constitute 52% of the population and females 48%. Gaura Barhaj has an average literacy rate of 75.37%, Greater than the national average of 74.04%: male literacy is 78.5%, and female literacy is 72.24%. In Gaura Barhaj, 16% of the population is under 6 years of age.

References

Cities and towns in Deoria district